Tepexi de Rodríguez (municipality) is a town and municipality in Puebla in south-eastern Mexico.

References

Municipalities of Puebla